The Mystic River Rugby Club, sometimes called Boston Mystic, is a New England Rugby Football Union (NERFU) club, founded in 1974, located in Malden, Massachusetts and Melrose, Massachusetts, who field teams in Division 1 American Rugby Premiership and Division 2 Rugby Union in the United States and are the current 2018 USA Rugby D1 National Champions.

Their home field is located at Pine Banks Park. Their primary sponsor is Coors Light.

History

The early years (1970s)
The Mystic River Rugby Club was founded in 1974 by 32 members of the Boston Rugby Club, who in true revolutionary spirit, took a great step forward in exercising their independence. These men had long since functioned as a ‘club within a club’ and had developed a distinct style of play both on and off the field. These members were experienced rugby players and immediately the Mystics established a schedule within the first division of New England. They soon became a sought after fixture by teams from all over based on a reputation for hard, fast rugby and an aggressive “joie de vie”.

The club evolved throughout the 1970s with the influx of younger players and Tours to Wales and the former Soviet Union highlighted these years. In 1978, the Mystics became the first American rugby team to be invited to play rugby in the Soviet Union. In the early 1980s the club saw a major turnover, a somewhat generational change, when several new players were attracted from local colleges. Old Boys rugby began to take shape and several of the original Mystics began playing a schedule of "over 30s" rugby. In 1986 the Mystics returned to Malden, Massachusetts where they were originally incorporated in 1976.

The 1990s: The birth of a dynasty
With several of the club's players regularly representing New England and the East Coast in representative side play, the Mystics were committed to championship level rugby. Their reputation earned them respect overseas as well, with touring sides, such as the Glamorgan County RFC, seeking a challenge at top level rugby.

In 1989, Mystic River defeated their parent club Boston to win the first of seven straight New England championships.
They would go on to win the Northeast Championship that same year.  In 1992 the Mystic finished second in the US, losing to the Old Blues from California in the National Finals. The Mystics had established themselves as a force within the national rugby community.

The 2000s
In 2000 and 2001, Mystic River competed in the short lived Major League Rugby (a former amateur club competition not to be confused with the current professional Major League Rugby competition).  Set up in the manner of the European Rugby Champions Cup, the MLR was designed to provide an additional competition structure for top division teams outside of their usual geographical unions and complement their USA Rugby competition schedule, however, it was never sanctioned by USA Rugby and the Mystics returned to competing solely in USA Rugby competition in the fall of 2001.

The 2007 season saw the Mystics win their first New England title after twelve years, moving on to take the Northeast Championship in 2008 and a spot in the National Division 1 Sweet 16. In their 2009–2010 season, Mystic River again took both the New England and Northeast Championships, making it through to the quarter-final round of the USA Rugby DI National Championship Series as well as making their first ever appearance in the National Sweet 16 in 7s competition. 2010 also marked the expansion of the Mystic River Youth Rugby Program and the addition of the U-19 Mystic Eagles, who saw success in both 15s and 7s tournaments in their inaugural season.

2014 merger with Middlesex

In 2014, Mystic River merged with cross-town rivals, the Middlesex Barbarians, in an effort to develop the game of rugby in the area. While the details of the merger allowed the forty-year-old rugby club to retain their name, Middlesex coach Josh Smith took over head coaching duties for the combined club, with former Eagle prop Jake Sprague as forwards coach, and Glen Mannering directing the backs, with the club now competing in both Division 1 and Division 2.

As the 2014–2015 season came to a close, the newly formed Mystics went undefeated at the top of the Division 1 table going into the playoffs.  Post season wins against White Plains RFC and Kansas City earned them their first trip to the USA Rugby D1 Final Four tournament since 1992, while in D2 the Mystic Barbarians took the NERFU D2 Championship against division rival New Haven, eventually losing to New York Rugby Club in the USA Rugby D2 Round of 16 beginning a new era for Mystic Rugby.

The Mystics also saw success in 7s, qualifying for the 2015 USA Rugby Club 7s (USARC7) Championship Series for the second time in club history, losing in the Semifinal round to eventual tournament winners Seattle Saracens, but coming away with the bronze medal.

American Rugby Premiership (2015—present)
Beginning in the 2015–2016 season, Mystic River became a "de facto" member of the American Rugby Premiership (ARP), joining Life Running Eagles and fellow Atlantic North D1 clubs Boston RFC, NYAC, Old Blue and the Boston Irish Wolfhounds in the reformatted elite competition.

Though officially a member of the Atlantic North Division 1 Conference, the Mystics competed in the ARP and played all teams but Life.  They finished their regular season with a record of 6 wins and 2 losses in their inaugural year in the elite competition, automatically securing a berth in the USA Rugby Championships quarter-final round as the number two seed in the Atlantic North Conference. A win over the Midwest Conference's number one seeded team would put the Mystics in the Final Four for the second year in a row, against ARP rivals Old Blue.  In the final match of the Eastern Championship Series, a 10–5 win put Mystic River in the Division 1 National Championship for the first time since 1992. The Mystics would go to play the Western Conference Champions, the Austin Blacks in the USA Rugby Emirates Airline Club Men's Division I National Championship.  After a hard-fought match, Mystic River won their first ever National Title by a score of 45–33.

At the beginning of the 2016–2017 season Mystic River became a full member of the ARP, making it through to the Eastern Division finals.  However, they were knocked out by NYAC 14–24.  The following season the Mystics were able shock the favored Norfolk Blues 36–22 to set up a revenge match with their New York rivals, beating NYAC 26—25 and earning a trip to the 2018 national championship game.  In the final match, Mystic River were able to stay ahead of their Western conference counterparts, Belmont Shore RFC and win their second national title by a score of 25–24.

Boston Mystics and Major League Rugby
Mystic River, which was called Boston Mystic or Mystics in some press releases, were scheduled for several 2018 exhibition games in Major League Rugby (MLR). Though they were merely exhibition, these matches were the first taste of the MLR professional era in the New England market.  In late 2018, the New England Free Jacks were announced as a 2020 expansion team in MLR and Mystic River subsequently became a main source of talent for the initial Free Jacks roster including head coach Josh Smith. For the Free Jacks' first exhibition match against Ontario in October 2018, there were 15 former Mystic River players on their roster, including coaches Smith and Kareem Afifi.

2018 season

National / representative players

USA Eagles
This is a list of players who currently or have at one time played for the Mystics and have represented their country with the United States national rugby union team, also known as the Eagles, in rugby fifteens or sevens.  Not represented in this list are the many Mystics who have been named to the Eagles' player pools or Junior sides over the years. For Rugby sevens players, (*) denotes tournament appearances such as World Rugby Sevens Series.

All-Americans (USA U-20/U-23) 
Below is a list of players who have received Rugby All-American honors.  The Collegiate All-Americans rugby team is considered the USA's U23 national team, while the Junior All-Americans are the USA's U20 national team.

Other Nations / Provinces
This is a list of Mystic River players who have represented other nations in rugby union fifteens or sevens, unless otherwise indicated. Players marked with a "♦" represented other nations in rugby league.

 David Barry (AUT)
 Declan Brady (IRL) ♦
 Sean Burgess (BVI)
 Mikel Facey (JAM)
 Marcos Flegmann (MEX)
 Steve Brain (ENG)
 Joseph Lusse (UGA U-19)
 Molibi Maphanyane (BOT)
 Guy Matisis (ISR)
 Herman Mostert (RSA)
 Jeron Pantor (TTO)
 Mikhael Shammas (LEB) ♦
 Edwin Shimenga (KEN)
 Alatasi Tupou (SAM)
 Alfred Uluinayau (FIJ)
 Kyle Winter (INA)

Provincial Representation

 Paulo Aukuso (WEL)
 Karl Darragh (LEIN Jrs)
 Rory Gleeson (LEIN Jrs)
 Anthony Hughes (CON U-21)
 David Joyce (MUN Jrs)
 Michael Kaivelata (AUK)
 Robbie Malneek (TAS)
 Etuini Pongi (PAC)
 Wayne Underhay (AUK)

Championships

Fifteens (Division 1)
New England Champions (1989–1995, 2009, 2015)
Northeast Champions (1989, 1991, 2007, 2009–2012, 2015)
Eastern Champions (1991, 2016, 2018)
National Champions (2016, 2018)
National Playoff Appearances:

Fifteens (Division 2)
New England Champions (2015, 2016, 2017)
National Playoff Appearances:

Sevens
USA Rugby Club 7s Championship Series

U19/Youth rugby
Mystic River founded their Youth Rugby program in 2005. It was originally aimed more at introducing local children in the surrounding community to the sport of rugby, via American Flag Rugby (AFL) and later USA Rugby's newly developed "Rookie Rugby", a non-contact flag variant of the sport for younger children.  In 2010, the Mystics expanded the program to include competitive U-17 and U-19 teams.  Both levels saw immediate success, quickly becoming perennial contenders and medalists in such competitions as the Bay State Games.

The Mystics also field a Collegiate Select Side which selects stand out local collegiate rugby talent and plays teams both in the United States and abroad.  In 2015, several former members of the Mystic Youth program would go on to receive collegiate All Conference honors.

After an undefeated season in 2017, the Mystic River U19 7s team accepted an invitation to the National High School Invitational 7s tournament held in Minneapolis, MN, marking the first time any Mystic youth program was invited to play in a national championship.  The Mystics continued their undefeated record throughout the tournament and claimed their first ever national championship title.

References

External links
 

1974 establishments in Massachusetts
Malden, Massachusetts
Rugby clubs established in 1974
Rugby union teams in Boston
Sports in Middlesex County, Massachusetts